Rugby Africa, is the administrative body for rugby union within the continent of Africa under the authority of World Rugby, which is the world governing body of rugby union. , Rugby Africa has 37 member nations and runs several rugby tournaments for national teams, including the Africa Cup which is the main 15-a-side competition for African national teams.

Rugby Africa was founded in 1986 as the Confederation of African Rugby (CAR) to promote, develop, organise and administer the game of rugby in Africa. It was renamed Rugby Africa in December 2014.

The President of Rugby Africa is the Herbert Mensah from Ghana.

History

The Confederation of African Rugby (French: Confédération Africaine de Rugby) was officially launched in January 1986 in Tunis. The inaugural members at the meeting were Ivory Coast, Kenya, Madagascar, Morocco, Senegal, the Seychelles, Tanzania and Tunisia. A meeting was held in July 1992 in Casablanca with the view of integrating the SARFU into the confederation.  South Africa had been denied entry until this time because of the government policy of apartheid (South African rugby had been governed by the mainly white South African Rugby Board and the mainly black South African Rugby Union).  In March 1992 these were formally combined to form the South African Rugby Football Union (SARFU). The Confederation now has 37 member nations.

African Rugby Charter
The African Rugby Charter was signed by the President of CAR, Abdelaziz Bougja, the then President of the South African Rugby Union (SARFU) Brian van Rooyen, in the presence of former South African president Nelson Mandela, and the South African Minister of Sport, Makhenkesi Stofile.

Members
World Rugby full members who are part of Rugby Africa:

World Rugby associate members who are part of Rugby Africa:

World Rugby non-members who are part of Rugby Africa (full or affiliate member):

World Rugby suspended members who are part of Rugby Africa:

Non-member countries working with the governing body (Rugby Africa non-members too):

Defunct African National Rugby Union Teams

World Rugby Rankings

Competitions

Tournaments run by Rugby Africa include:

Senior Men
Men XV
Rugby Africa Cup
Rugby Africa Gold Cup
Rugby Africa Silver Cup
Rugby Africa Bronze Cup
African Development Trophy
Men VII
Africa Men's Sevens

Senior Women
Women XV
Rugby Africa Women's Cup
Women VII
Africa Women's Sevens

Youth
Men XV
U20 Barthés Trophy

Development programs
The CAR formed agreements in 2014 which allowed member unions from Anglophone and Francophone nations in Africa to access training programs within the sports academies and administrative headquarters of the South African Rugby Union and French Rugby Federation, respectively. These agreements, designed to foster rugby development across the continent, were signed in January 2015, and followed earlier arrangements with the SARU and French club Castres Olympique which were made in 2006.

Leopards

The African Leopards are a representative team from Africa which aims to promote the sport throughout the whole of Africa. The Leopards played their first ever match in July 2005 at Ellis Park as a curtain raiser between Springboks and Australia.

Notes and references

Notes

References

External links
Rugbyafrique.com Rugby Africa official website

Rug
 
Sports organizations established in 1986
1986 establishments in Africa